The 2005 Vuelta a Burgos was the 27th edition of the Vuelta a Burgos road cycling stage race, which was held from 7 August to 11 August 2005. The race started and finished in Burgos. The race was won by Juan Carlos Domínguez of the  team.

General classification

References

Vuelta a Burgos
2005 in road cycling
2005 in Spanish sport